Stepin may refer to:

 Aleksandr Stepin (born 1972), Russian footballer
 Stepin Lug, suburb of Belgrade
 Stępin, Polish village
 Stepin Fetchit (1902–1985), American vaudevillian, comedian, and film actor
 Styopin, surname